Georgy Petrovich Fedotov (October 1 (13) 1886, Saratov, Russian Empire, – September 1, 1951, New York, US) was a Russian religious philosopher, historian, essayist, author of many books on Orthodox culture, regarded by some as a founder of Russian "theological culturology". Fedotov left Soviet Russia under duress for France in 1925, then in 1939 emigrated to the United States where he taught at St. Vladimir Orthodox Seminary, New York, and continued publishing books up until his death in 1951.

He was a Guggenheim Fellow for the academic year 1946–1947.

Works
Святой Филипп митрополит Московский. — Paris: Ymca-press, 1928. — 224 с.
Святые древней Руси (X—XVII ст.) — Paris: Ymca press, 1931. — 260 с.
The Russian Religious Mind, New York, Harper & Brother, 1946  
A Treasury of Russian Spirituality, [comp.& ed.], London, Sheed & Ward, 1950
St. Filipp, Metropolitan of Moscow : encounter with Ivan the Terrible, Belmont, Mass. : Nordland Pub. Co. 1978

References

External links
Biography in English at Academia.edu

1886 births
1951 deaths
Writers from Saratov
Russian male essayists
20th-century essayists
20th-century Russian philosophers